

Grade point scale 
In Indonesia, a grade point scale is used. Before the adoption of Kurikulum Berbasis Kompetensi (Competency-Based Curriculum) in 2004, the grading scale used was:

After the Ministry of Education approved the use of Kurikulum Berbasis Kompetensi (Competency-Based Curriculum) in Indonesia, the grade point range was changed to a 0-100 scale. However, the passing score differs between one subject and another.

A student is to repeat a year if he or she earns a failing grade in any core subject (Mathematics, Indonesian Language, Religious Education, Science, Social Studies, Civics, Etc.) or if the student fails in more than two non-core subjects. (Local languages, etc.)

Grade letter 
Grading systems for universities are different. Grades are usually assigned in letters, following four-point system. Generally, Indonesian universities equate A with numerical value of 4.0 and E with 0.0. Some universities also employs intermediate grades such as A- and B+. This following list describes customary grade boundaries:

The lowest passing grade in an exam is usually D or 1 point and to be considered for graduation students must obtain a minimum cumulative GPA of 2.000.

Universities are free to (and hence, might) adopt different grading systems or  standards at will. Some examples are:

Latin honors grade equivalence

References 

Indonesia
Grading
Grading